The Very Best of the Electric Light Orchestra is a compilation album by the Electric Light Orchestra (ELO), released in 1994. It peaked at number four on the UK Albums Chart.

Track listing

Certifications

References

Albums produced by Jeff Lynne
Electric Light Orchestra compilation albums
1994 greatest hits albums